Vincent J. McGowan (August 13, 1913 – April 4, 1982) was an American professional basketball player. He played in the National Basketball League for several teams, including the Whiting/Hammond Ciesar All-Americans, Chicago Bruins, and Chicago American Gears. McGowan was a second-team all-NBL selection in 1937–38. For his career he averaged 5.3 points per game.

References 

1913 births
1982 deaths
American men's basketball players
Basketball players from Illinois
Centers (basketball)
Chicago American Gears players
Chicago Bruins players
DePaul Blue Demons men's basketball players
Forwards (basketball)
Hammond Ciesar All-Americans players
Loyola Ramblers men's basketball players
Whiting Ciesar All-Americans players